Nathan Eaton (born December 22, 1996) is an American professional baseball infielder and outfielder for the Kansas City Royals of Major League Baseball (MLB). He played college baseball at the Virginia Military Institute, and was drafted by the Royals in the 21st round of the 2018 Major League Baseball draft. He made his MLB debut in 2022.

Career
Eaton attended Thomas Dale High School in Chester, Virginia and played college baseball at the Virginia Military Institute. In 2018 he batted .287/.402/.507 while leading the Southern Conference with 36 steals and being caught five times.	He was drafted by the Kansas City Royals in the 21st round of the 2018 Major League Baseball draft. He made his professional debut with the Idaho Falls Chukars and played in 2019 with the Lexington Legends, batting .233/.305/.336 in 497 at bats and stealing 18 bases in 19 attempts.

Eaton did not play for a team in 2020 due to the Minor League Baseball season being cancelled because of the Covid-19 pandemic. He played 2021 with the Arizona Complex League Royals and Quad Cities River Bandits, and for three minor league teams that season batted .243/.350/.368 in 272 at bats with 23 stolen bases in 26 attempts. After the season, he played in the Arizona Fall League and was selected to play in the Fall Stars Game. 

Eaton started 2022 with Northwest Arkansas Naturals before being promoted to the Omaha Storm Chasers, and in 2022 between the two teams he batted .285/.358/.465 in 388 at bats with 23 stolen bases in 28 attempts.

The Royals promoted Eaton to the major leagues on July 14, 2022. He was returned to the minors on July 18. He had his contract purchased on August 3, 2022.

In 2022 with the Royals he batted .264/.331/.387 in 106 at bats with 11 steals in 12 attempts.

References

External links

1996 births
Living people
Arizona Complex League Royals players
Baseball players from Virginia
Idaho Falls Chukars players
Kansas City Royals players
Lexington Legends players
Major League Baseball infielders
Major League Baseball outfielders
Northwest Arkansas Naturals players
Omaha Storm Chasers players
People from Chester, Virginia
Quad Cities River Bandits players
Surprise Saguaros players
VMI Keydets baseball players